Comunión (or )  is a village and concejo located in the municipality of Lantarón, in Álava province, Basque Country, Spain. It is the capital of the municipality.

References

External links
 

Concejos in Lantarón